Oulad Rechache is a district in eastern Khenchela, Algeria and one of the oldest areas in this state in the Middle Algeria that emerged as a district in 1990. It is adjacent to the state capital, and includes two municipalities. This district is located in a border area between Khanshalah and Tebessa and was important in fight against France during the Algerian Revolution. It is one of the most important areas to maintain the Tamazight language (local accent) comparing to the state capital, where much circulation of Chaouia is widely relevant in all aspects of daily life.

Its name comes from the largest throne in the community of the Amazigh, before becoming the name of the District.

Climate 

Oued Rechache District is characterized by the steppe climate which prevails in the Aures highlands. This climate is transitional between the Mediterranean climate and the dry desert climate that is characterized by continental rain conditions ranging from 300–500 mm per year.  Rain is not regular, with monthly extreme thermal sensitivity, and most days of the winter feature ice.

Community 
The population of Olad Rechache district is 52,993 according to 1998 statistics. The people are mainly Amazigh (Chaouia).

Customs and traditions 
The Oulad Rechace population does not differ much from the rest of the Amazigh in terms of customs and traditions. are steeped in the throne is a large inherited from ancestors in the way of their dress such Jalaba and Albernos. It has the oldest of the Amazigh Pass in North Africa – Ksksoo (couscous) is best of Arashashien (Oulad Rechache Peoples) dishes. It dates to the pre-Islam, in addition to Achakhcokha dish and other delicious dishes that are still present on the table despite the factors of civilization.

Habits and traits that are characteristic the Oulad Rechace people, "we note that the courage and respecting  the scholars, generosity of visitors (Guest) steadiness of principle and showed the qualities of the population since the times provided.

Administrative division 
The district is further divided into two municipalities and four villages, respectively:

Municipalities
Ouled Rechache as a municipality & Capital of District.
El Mahmal municipality located 12 km west of district.

Villages
Ras Elma as a village located 7 km east of district.
Elmayta as a village located 60 km south of district.
Icherthithen as a village located 15 km west of district.
Boudakhan as a village located 40 km south of district.
Oulad azddin as a village located 11 km east west of district.

Oulad Rechache industries
Oulade Rechache's industries produce notably:
 Flour and its derivatives.
 Meat of all kinds
 Vegetables of all kinds. 
 Beverages.
 There is also much handicraft production.

References

Districts of Khenchela Province

Communes of Khenchela Province